Peroxisomal carnitine O-octanoyltransferase is an enzyme that in humans is encoded by the CROT gene.

Carnitine octanoyltransferase (EC 2.3.1.137) is a carnitine acyltransferase that catalyzes the reversible transfer of fatty acyl groups between CoA and carnitine. This enzyme regulates the breakdown of Very Long Chain Fatty Acids (VLCFA) by performing a crucial step in the transport of medium length acyl chains out of the mammalian peroxisome to the cytosol and mitochondria for further breakdown. See also CRAT (MIM 600184). Van der Leij et al. (2000) reviewed the function, structural features, and phylogenetics of human carnitine acyltransferase genes, including CROT.[supplied by OMIM]

References

External links

Further reading